Viscount  was a Japanese diplomat before and during the Second World War.

Biography
Mushanokōji was the third son in the 10th generation of aristocratic Mushanokōji family and born in Kōjimachi, Chiyoda, Japan. He graduated from the Law School of Tokyo Imperial University. His younger brother was part of the delegation to the Eleventh Ordinary Session of the Assembly of the League of Nations and the delegation to the Special Session of the Assembly Convened in Virtue of Article 15 of the Covenant at the Request of the Republic of China Government.

From 1929 to 1933, he served as Japanese Ambassador to Sweden and non-resident Ambassador to Finland and in that capacity signed on behalf of the Japanese government the Convention on Certain Questions Relating to the Conflict of Nationality Laws (April 12, 1930). He served as Japanese Ambassador to Germany from 1934 to 1937 and in that capacity signed the Anti-Comintern Pact as the representative of Japan. A viscount, he received the Grand Cross of the Royal Order of the Polar Star (Sweden) in 1933.

After the Second World War, he was purged from public office by the occupation authorities. From 1952 to 1955, he served as chairman of the Japanese-German Society.

See also
 List of Ambassadors of Japan to Finland
 List of Japanese ministers, envoys and ambassadors to Germany

References

1882 births
1962 deaths
People from Chiyoda, Tokyo
Kazoku
Ambassadors of Japan to Sweden
Ambassadors of Japan to Finland
Ambassadors of Japan to Germany
Japanese anti-communists
Knights Commander of the Order of Merit of the Federal Republic of Germany